Ana Luísa Amaral (5 April 1956 – 5 August 2022) was a Portuguese poet. Professor at the University of Porto, she held a Ph.D. on the poetry of Emily Dickinson and had academic publications (in Portugal and abroad) in the areas of English and American poetry, comparative poetics, and feminist studies. She was a senior researcher and co-director of the Institute for Comparative Literature Margarida Losa. Co-author (with Ana Gabriela Macedo) of the Dictionary of Feminist Criticism (Afrontamento, 2005) and responsible for the annotated edition of New Portuguese Letters (Dom Quixote, 2010) and the coordinator of the international project New Portuguese Letters 40 Years Later, financed by FCT, that involves 10 countries and over 60 researchers. Editor of
several academic books, such as Novas Cartas Portuguesas entre Portugal e o Mundo (with Marinela Freitas, Dom Quixote, 2014), or New Portuguese Letters to the World (with Marinela Freitas, Peter Lang, 2015).

Prior to her death, she was preparing a book of poetry, a novel, and two books of essays. In 2021, a book of essays on her work by Peter Lang (ed. Claire Williams) titled The Most Perfect Excess: The Works of Ana Luísa Amaral was published.

Several plays were staged around her work, such as O olhar diagonal das coisas, A história da Aranha Leopoldina, Próspero Morreu, or Como Tu.

Literary career
Amaral's first volume of poetry, Minha Senhora de Quê (Mistress of What), was published in 1990. The collection's title alluded to Maria Teresa Horta's 1971 volume Minha Senhora de Mim (Milady of Me), thereby explicitly inscribing Amaral's work into the emergent genealogy of Portuguese women’s poetry. Since then, she has published fifteen further original collections of poetry and two volumes of collected poems, in addition to several translations (including poetry by Emily Dickinson, John Updike and Louise Glück) and books for children.

Amaral's poetry has been translated into several languages and volumes of her writings have been published in the United States of America, United Kingdom, Germany, Spain, France, Brazil, Italy, Sweden, Holland, Venezuela, Colombia, Hong Kong, Mexico and Slovenia. She is also represented in many Portuguese and international anthologies. Her work has been awarded several distinctions such as the Gold Medal of Câmara Municipal de Matosinhos and the Gold Medal of Câmara Municipal do Porto, for "services to literature", or the Medaille de la Ville de Paris, and several literary prizes, such as the Correntes d’Escritas Literary Prize, o Premio di Poesia Giuseppe Acerbi, o Great Prize for Poetry of the Portuguese Writers' Association, the António Gedeão Prize, the Internazionale Fondazione Roma, Ritratti di Poesia Prize, o PEN Prize for Fiction, Prize for Essay from the Portuguese Association of Literary Critics, the Premio Leteo (Spain), Best Poetry Book of the Year from the Grémio de Librerias de Madrid, Vergílio Ferreira Prize, Sá de Miranda Literary Prize or the Premio Reina Sofía de Poesía Iberoamericana.

Books

Poetry

 Minha senhora de quê, Fora do Texto, 1990; re., Quetzal, 1999
 Coisas de partir, Fora do Texto, 1993; re., Gótica, 2001
 Epopeias, Fora do Texto, 1994
 E muitos os caminhos, Poetas de Letras, 1995
 Às vezes o paraíso, Quetzal, 1998; re. 2000.
 Imagens, Campo das Letras, 2000
 Imagias, Gótica, 2002
 A arte de ser tigre, Gótica, 2003
 Poesia Reunida 1990–2005, Quasi, 2005
 A génese do amor, Campo das Letras, 2005; 2nd edition, 2006
 Entre dois rios e outras noites, Campo das Letras, 2008
 Se fosse um intervalo, Dom Quixote, 2009
 Inversos, Poesia 1990–2010, Dom Quixote, 2010
 Vozes, Dom Quixote, 2011; 2nd edition 2012; 3rd edition 2015
 Escuro, Assírio & Alvim, 2014
 E Todavia, Assírio & Alvim, 2015
 What's in a name, Assírio & Alvim, 2017
Ágora, Assírio & Alvim, 2019
Mundo, Assírio & Alvim, 2021 (forthcoming)

Essay
 Arder a palavra e outros incêndios, Relógio D'Água, 2018

Theater
 Próspero Morreu, Caminho, 2011

Fiction 
 Ara, Sextante, 2013

Children's books 
 Gaspar, o Dedo Diferente e Outras Histórias, (illust. Elsa Navarro), Campo das Letras, 1999
 A História da Aranha Leopoldina, (illust. Elsa Navarro), Campo das Letras, 2000
 A Relíquia, based on the novel by Eça de Queirós, Quasi, 2008
 Auto de Mofina Mendes, based on the play by Gil Vicente, Quasi, 2008
 A História da Aranha Leopoldina, (illust. Raquel Pinheiro), Civilização, 2010 (reviewed edition, with CD. Music by Clara Ghimel, and Nuno Aragão, sung by Rosa Quiroga, Nuno Aragão and Sissa Afonso)
 Gaspar, o Dedo Diferente, (illust. Abigail Ascenso), Civilização, 2011 (reviewed edition)
 A Tempestade, (illust. Marta Madureira), Quidnovi 2011 – Selected for the Portuguese National Reading Plan
 Como Tu, (illust. Elsa Navarro), Quidnovi, 2012 (With CD – audiobook and songs, music of Antonio Pinho Vargas, piano by Álvaro Teixeira Lopes, voices of Pedro Lamares, Rute Pimenta and Ana Luísa Amaral – Selected for the Portuguese National Reading Plan
 Lengalenga de Lena, a Hiena, (illust. Jaime Ferraz), Zero a Oito, 2019
A História da Aranha Leopoldina, (illust. Jaime Ferraz), Zero a Oito, 2019
Gaspar, o Dedo Diferente, (illust. Chico Bolila), Zero a Oito, 2019
Como Tu, (illust. Alberto Faria), Zero a Oito, 2020

Translations

 Xanana Gusmão, Mar Meu/My Sea of Timor, co-transl. with  Kristy Sword (Granito, 1998)
 Eunice de Souza, Poemas Escolhidos (Cotovia, 2001)
 John Updike, Ponto Último e Outros Poemas  (Civilização, 2009)
 Emily Dickinson, Cem Poemas (Relógio D'Água, 2010)
 Emily Dickinson, Duzentos Poemas (Relógio d’Água, 2015)
 Patricia Highsmith, Carol (Relógio d'Água, 2015)
 William Shakespeare, 30 Sonetos (Relógio d'Água, 2015)
Mário de Sá-Carneiro, Seven Songs of Decline and Other Poems, co-trad. Margaret Jull Costa, ed. Ricardo Vasconcelos (Francis Boutle Publishers, 2020)
Louise Glück, A Íris Selvagem (Relógio d'Água, 2020)
Arnold Wesker, Primavera Selvagem (Edições Humus, 2020)
Louise Glück, Vita Nova (Relógio d'Água, 2021)
Emily Dickinson, Herbarium (Relógio d'Água, forthcoming)
Margaret Atwood, Políticas de Poder (Relógio d'Água, forthcoming)

Ana Luísa Amaral’s books published in other countries

United States
 The Art of Being a Tiger. Selected Poems, trans. Margaret Jull Costa, Tagus Press, 2018
 What's in a name?, trans. Margaret Jull Costa, New Directions, 2019

Brazil
 A gênese do amor, Gryphus, Rio de Janeiro, 2008
 Vozes, Iluminuras, São Paulo, 2013
 Escuro, Iluminuras, São Paulo, 2015
 Ara, Iluminuras, São Paulo, 2016
Luzes, Iluminuras, São Paulo, 2021 (forthcoming)

Colombia 
 Entre otras noches, Antologia Poética, trans. Lauren Mendinueta, Taller de Edición-Rocca, Bogotá, 2013
 Como Tu,  trans. Lauren Mendinueta, Taller de Edición-Rocca, Bogotá,  2014
Qué Hay en un Nombre, trad. Pedro Rapoula, Puro Pássaro, Bogotá, 2020

France 
 Images, trans. Catherine Dumas, Vallongues Éditions, 2000
 Comme Toi, trans. Catherine Dumas, Editions Theatrales, Paris, 2013
 L’Art d’être tigre, trans. Catherine Dumas, Phare du Cousseixo, 2015
Germany

 Was ist ein Name, trad. Michael Kegler & Piero Salabe, Hanser Verlag, Munchen, 2021

Hong Kong 

 Nude: a Study in Poignancy, The Chinese University of Hong Kong Press, Hong Kong, 2019

Italy 
 Poesie, trans. Livia Apa, Poesie, XVª Edizione – Portogallo, Lisbona, Instituto Camões, 2008
 La Genesi dell’Amore, trans. Piero Ceccucci, Fiorenza mia…!:, Florence, Firenze University Press, 2009
 La Scala di Giacobbe: Poesia di Ana Luísa Amaral, trans. Livia Apa, Manni Editori, Milan, 2010
 Voci, trans. Chiara De Luca, Kolibris, 2018
What's in a Name e altri versi, trans. Livia Apa, Crocetti Editore, Milano, 2019

Mexico 
 Oscuro, Universidad Autónoma de Nuevo Léon, trans. Blanca Luz Pulido, 2017

The Netherlands 
 Wachten op Odysseus: Gedichten 1990–2011, trans. Arie Pos, uitgeverij IJZER, 2011
Slovenia

 What’s in a Name, trans. Barbara Juršič, Beletrina, Lubiana, 2021

Spain 
 Oscuro, trans. Luis Maria Marina, Olifante, 2015
What's in a Name, trans. Paula Abramo, Sexto Piso, Madrid, 2020
Mundo, trans. Paula Abramo, Sexto Piso, Madrid, 2021 (forthcoming)

Sweden 
 Mellan tva floder och andra natter, trans. Ulla Gabrielson, Diadorim, Gothenburg, 2009
Mitt Klärobskyra, En Antologi Poesi av Ana Luísa Amaral, trans. Ulla Gabrielson, Diadorim, Gotemburgo, 2021 (forthcoming)

Venezuela 
 Ana Luisa Amaral, Antología Poética, trans. Nidia Hernandez, Monte Ávila Editores, Caracas, 2012

Prizes and awards

 Literary Prize Casino da Póvoa/Correntes d’Escritas, with the book A génese do amor (2007)
 Premio Letterario Giuseppe Acerbi, Mantua Italy, with the book A génese do amor (2008)
 Great Prize of Poetry of Associação Portuguesa de Escritores, with the book Entre Dois Rios e Outras Noites (2008)
 Finalist for the Prize Portugal Telecom (with A génese do amor, Gryphus, 2008)
 Prize Rómulo de Carvalho/António Gedeão, 1st edition, with the book Vozes (2012)
 Proposed to the Prize Reina Sofia (2013)
 Prize of Novel of Associação Portuguesa de Escritores, with the book Ara (2014)
 Finalist for the Prize Portugal Telecom (with Vozes, Iluminuras, 2014)
 Gold Medal of Câmara Municipal de Matosinhos, for services to literature (2015)
 Gold Medal of Câmara Municipal do Porto (2016)
Premio Internazionale Fondazione Roma: Ritratti di Poesia (2018)
Prize for Essay Jacinto do Prado Coelho, from the Portuguese Association of Literary Critics (2018), with the book Arder a palavra e outros incêndios (2018)
Guerra Junqueiro Literary Prize (2020)
Best Poetry Book of the Year from the Grémio de Librerias de Madrid, with the book What's in a Name (2020)
Leteo Prize (2020) 
Francisco Sá de Miranda Literary Prize, with the book Ágora (2021)
Virgílio Ferreira Prize (2021)
XXX Premio Rainha Sofia de Poesia Ibero-americana (2021).

External links
 Ana Luísa Amaral on Poetry International Web
 Amaral's bio on the site of the Centre for the Study of Contemporary Women's Writing (University of London)

References

1956 births
2022 deaths
20th-century Portuguese poets
University of Porto alumni
People from Lisbon
Portuguese women novelists
21st-century Portuguese poets
Portuguese women poets
20th-century Portuguese women writers
21st-century Portuguese women writers
Portuguese children's writers
Portuguese women dramatists and playwrights
21st-century Portuguese dramatists and playwrights
Portuguese translators